Plaesianillus is a monotypic genus of European sheet weavers containing the single species, Plaesianillus cyclops. It was first described by Eugène Louis Simon in 1926, and has only been found in France.

See also
 List of Linyphiidae species (I–P)

References

Linyphiidae
Monotypic Araneomorphae genera